Zolertine is an alpha-1 adrenoceptor antagonist.

References

Alpha-1 blockers
Phenylpiperazines
Tetrazoles